Euan Dale (born 18 December 1985) is a Scottish competitive swimmer who has represented Great Britain in the Olympics and Scotland in the Commonwealth Games.  At the 2006 Commonwealth Games in Melbourne, he was a member of the second-place Scottish men's team in the 4×200-metre freestyle relay, for which he won a silver medal.  Individually, Dale won a silver in the men's 400-metre individual medley.

At the 2008 Summer Olympics in Beijing, he competed in the 400-metre individual relay swimming event.

Dale attended Millfield School (1997–2004) and studied Accounting and Finance at Loughborough University.

References

External links
British Swimming athlete profile
British Olympic Association athlete profile

Commonwealth Games silver medallists for Scotland
Scottish male swimmers
Olympic swimmers of Great Britain
Swimmers at the 2008 Summer Olympics
Commonwealth Games medallists in swimming
Living people
1985 births
Alumni of Loughborough University
Swimmers at the 2006 Commonwealth Games
People educated at Millfield
Medallists at the 2006 Commonwealth Games